Pin Heel Stomp is an EP that was released November 30, 1997 by The 5.6.7.8's. "The Barracuda" is featured in The Fast and the Furious: Tokyo Drift Soundtrack.

Track listing
 "Pin Heel Stomp"
 "Dance in the Avenue A"
 "Arkansas Twists"
 "Hey! Mashed Potato, Hey!"
 "Spell Stroll"
 "The Barracuda"

References

1997 albums
The 5.6.7.8's albums